Chondracanthus may refer to:
 Chondracanthus (alga), an alga genus in the family Gigartinaceae
 Chondracanthus (crustacean), a copepod genus in the family Chondracanthidae